The 1965 Idaho Vandals football team represented the University of Idaho in the 1965 NCAA University Division football season.  were led by first-year head coach Steve Musseau and played in the Big Sky Conference for the first time; they played the previous six seasons as an independent in the NCAA University Division. Home games were played on campus at Neale Stadium in Moscow, with one home game in Boise at old Bronco Stadium at Boise Junior College.

Musseau was previously the defensive coach and was promoted after the February departure of Dee Andros for Oregon State.

Season
Idaho won the Battle of the Palouse with neighbor Washington State for the second straight year, this time by a score of 17–13 at Rogers Field in  It was the first time Idaho logged consecutive wins over the Cougars in forty years. The Vandals lost close games to the other three  Northwest teams of the AAWU (Pac-8).

The other two quarterbacks were Jerry Ahlin and Joe Rodriguez, who both started games in 1965.

Schedule

Roster

All-conference
Seven Vandals were selected to the all-conference team: fullback Ray McDonald, guard Dave Triplett, center Steve Buratto, defensive end Tom Stephens, defensive tackle Dick Arndt, linebacker Jerry Campbell, and defensive back 

On the second team were tackle Joe Dobson, guard Steve Ulrich, running back Tim Lavens, defensive end Ray Miller, middle guard John Boisen, linebacker LaVerle Pratt, and defensive back Jerry Ahlin.  Honorable mention were defensive tackle John Daniel, defensive back Byron Strickland, tight end John Whitney, wide receivers Joe Chapman and Rich Toney, and tackle Gary Fitzpatrick.

McDonald was a second-team AP

NFL Draft
Four Vandals were selected in the 1966 NFL Draft, which lasted twenty rounds (305 selections).

 The first three were futures picks and played in the 1966 season for Idaho.

Four Vandal juniors were selected in the 1967 NFL/AFL Draft, the first common draft, which lasted seventeen rounds (445 selections).

List of Idaho Vandals in the NFL Draft

References

External links
Gem of the Mountains: 1966 University of Idaho yearbook – 1965 football season
Go Mighty Vandals – 1965 football season
Idaho Argonaut – student newspaper – 1965 editions

Idaho
Idaho Vandals football seasons
Big Sky Conference football champion seasons
Idaho Vandals football